Hyman A. Pressman (April 23, 1914 – March 15, 1996) served as the Comptroller of Baltimore City, Maryland, from 1963–1991.  He ran for Governor of Maryland in 1966 as an Independent after the Democratic Party nominated segregationist George P. Mahoney as its candidate.

Pressman's gubernatorial candidacy may have been a spoiler for Mahoney. Had the 10% of the vote received by Pressman instead gone to Mahoney, Spiro Agnew would have lost the 1966 gubernatorial election by a narrow margin. Had Agnew not been elected governor of Maryland in 1966, it is unlikely that he would have been chosen as Richard Nixon's vice-presidential running mate in 1968.  Mahoney's support of segregation alienated many liberal Democrats, prompting them to split their tickets by supporting him or the pro-civil rights Agnew.

Pressman lost his first bid for election in the 1963 Baltimore Democratic Primary election for City Comptroller to Henry R. Hergenroeder, Sr. by just over 1,200 votes (less than 1%). Following the election, the Republican Party candidate withdrew and Pressman accepted the Republican nomination as their candidate for City Comptroller. He won the General Election running on a 'ticket' with former Baltimore Mayor and Maryland Governor Republican Theodore Roosevelt McKeldin, who was elected as Mayor the same year. Pressman returned to the Democratic Party following his victory and won six additional terms as Baltimore City Comptroller.

Involvement in the departure of the Colts
During the 1970s when the Baltimore Colts owner Robert Irsay and Baltimore Orioles owner Jerold Hoffberger were seeking major upgrades to the outdated Memorial Stadium, or the building of a new stadium,  Pressman opposed the use of public money to build a replacement. During the 1974 elections, Pressman had an amendment to the city's charter placed on the fall ballot. Known as Question P, the amendment called for declaring "the 33rd Street stadium as a memorial to war veterans and prohibiting use of city funds for construction of any other stadium." The measure passed 56 percent to 44 percent, effectively destroying any chance of a new, modern sports complex being built in Baltimore.

In 1984, the city's NFL franchise left for Indianapolis. In the next elections, city voters repealed Question P by a measure of 62 percent to 38 percent, paving the way for the construction of both Oriole Park at Camden Yards and Ravens Stadium (later renamed M&T Bank Stadium). Pressman remained as an elected City Comptroller for 28 years (7 terms in a row) until retiring in 1991.

References

1914 births
1996 deaths
Comptrollers in the United States
Maryland Republicans
Maryland Democrats
Maryland Independents